The 1986 Virginia Cavaliers football team represented the University of Virginia during the 1986 NCAA Division I-A football season. The Cavaliers were led by fifth-year head coach George Welsh and played their home games at Scott Stadium in Charlottesville, Virginia. They competed as members of the Atlantic Coast Conference, finishing tied for sixth.

Schedule

Personnel

Season summary

NC State

at North Carolina

North Carolina's Eric Lewis and Virginia's Eric Clay were ejected in second quarter for fighting
North Carolina's late touchdown pass angered Virginia players but Virginia had called timeout just prior to the scoring play

References

Virginia
Virginia Cavaliers football seasons
Virginia Cavaliers football